Panus purpuratus is a fungus in the family, Panaceae, first described by Greta Stevenson in 1964.  The type species was collected from fallen wood in a coastal forest in Waikanae in 1949. The species is endemic to New Zealand.

References

External links
Panus purpuratus: images and occurrence data from GBIF

Polyporales
Fungi of New Zealand
Taxa named by Greta Stevenson
Fungi described in 1964